Ynyswen is a village in the community of Treorchy, in the county borough of Rhondda Cynon Taf, Wales.

Ynyswen consists mostly of housing. It has an industrial estate which was once the site of Burberry's factory, one shop, and the Forest View Medical Centre.

The area has several chapels and churches. Tynycoed Chapel, located between Ynyswen and Penycae, was first constructed in 1774, and was rebuilt in 1829. 

Ynyswen infant's school takes children until the age of 7. From then they must go to a different primary school: usually Penyrenglyn Primary School or Treorchy Primary School. Ynyswen Welsh School is a Welsh-speaking primary school that serves the Rhondda Valley. There is no nearby Welsh-speaking comprehensive school and so pupils mostly attend a Welsh school some miles away.

Ynyswen railway station is on the Rhondda Line opened by British Rail.

On 5 March 2021 many emergency vehicles, including an air ambulance, were called after a major incident, centred on the Blue Sky Chinese take-away, in Baglan Road. One villager said there were reports that at least two people had been stabbed by a man who then fled the scene. A 16-year-old girl died and two men were arrested after suffering serious injuries.

References 

Villages in Rhondda Cynon Taf
Treorchy